Dorothy Ray Healey (September 22, 1914 – August 6, 2006) was a long-time activist in the Communist Party USA, from the late 1920s to the 1970s. In the 1930s, she was one of the first union leaders to advocate for the rights of Chicanos and blacks as factory and field workers. 

During the decades of the 1950s and 1960s, Healey was one of the leading public figures of the Communist Party in the state of California. An opponent of the Soviet invasion of Czechoslovakia in 1968 and at odds with the orthodox pro-Soviet leadership of Gus Hall, Healey subsequently left the Communist Party to join the New American Movement, which merged to become part of the Democratic Socialists of America in 1982. She became a national vice-chair of DSA.

Early life
Healey was born Dorothy Harriet Rosenblum in Denver  to Hungarian Jewish immigrants. Her father's family, the Rosenblums, were proud of their Hungarian background and considered themselves Austro-Hungarians rather than Jews. Her mother's family, on the other hand, were Orthodox Jews, with her maternal grandfather serving as a shokhet, a supervisor of the ritual slaughter of animals to ensure that they were kosher.

Healey was a so-called "red diaper baby". Her mother was won over to socialism as a teenager after hearing a lecture on the subject delivered by J. Stitt Wilson in 1900 and later took part in helping to establish the Communist Party of America. Her father was an apolitical traveling salesman, peddling foodstuffs to grocery stores. Her mother bore six children, one dying at birth and another dying in early childhood. She also performed multiple abortions upon herself, nearly dying of blood poisoning on one occasion, as a result of the procedure when Dorothy was a young girl.

When Dorothy was six, the family relocated to Los Angeles, where she would eventually become known as the "Red Queen of Los Angeles." As her father moved about the West, his family moved with him, and she attended 19 schools before dropping out of high school. At 14, she joined the youth section of the Workers (Communist) Party, the Young Workers League, and the adult Communist Party itself in 1932, at 18. At the behest of the YCL she took a job in a peach processing factory, making 12 cents an hour and hiding when government labor inspectors came looking for underage workers. It was there where she gained her first experience as an organizer.

Leader in party

Her convictions about social justice and issues of race, class, unions and labor fueled her activism. From the moment that she joined the CPUSA, she was a true believer. "We knew with absolute conviction that we were part of a vanguard that was destined to lead an American working class to a socialist revolution", she once said. Healey became a successful labor organizer and rose to become the chair of the CPUSA in Southern California. Eventually, she joined the national Party leadership. She mentored many young communists and labor activists. In the 1950s, she and 14 other Californians were convicted under the Smith Act of conspiring to advocate the forceful overthrow of the government. She faced five years in prison and a $10,000 fine before the Supreme Court overturned the conviction.

In the 1960s, she again faced imprisonment and a hefty fine under a piece of McCarthy-era legislation known as the McCarran Act, when she and others refused to register as agents of a foreign government (the logic being that the CPUSA was under the control of the Soviet Union). In 1965, the Supreme Court reconsidered an earlier decision and found the registration provision to be in violation of the Fifth Amendment guarantee against self-incrimination.

Break with party
A critical moment for her came in 1956, after the reading of Nikita Khrushchev's speech, "On the Personality Cult and its Consequences," which revealed the crimes that Joseph Stalin committed under the USSR's one-party system. "The speech went on for four hours, and I was reduced to tears after about 30 minutes," she said. "Fact after fact of monstrous things had happened. It was a relentless account. But I believed it. There was no questioning its authenticity."  From that point, she was outspoken in her insistence for the American Communist Party to support democracy and reduce its ties with the Soviets.

Although many others like novelist Howard Fast left the CPUSA after the revelations of Stalin's crimes, Healey tried to reform it from within. Her story is told in a book she wrote with historian Maurice Isserman, Dorothy Healey Remembers: A Life in the American Communist Party (1990), in which she revealed "the aspirations, commitment, illusions -- and, ultimately, disillusionment -- of a generation of young Communists" who joined the movement before and during the Great Depression.

She resigned from her leadership post in 1968, after Soviet Party Boss Leonid Brezhnev ordered Soviet and Warsaw Pact troops to crush the movement in Czechoslovakia. She stayed in the party until 1973, when she resigned in a dispute with CPUSA General Secretary Gus Hall over issues of orthodoxy, to which she could no longer conform. The end came when she could no longer hold her tongue and publicly criticized the Party.

Later life
In 1974, Healey joined the New American Movement, and in 1975, she became a member of its national interim committee. Later, she supported the merger of NAM with the Democratic Socialist Organizing Committee in 1982, to form the Democratic Socialists of America. Through her involvement with NAM and the Democratic Socialists, she provided an important link between the activists of the 1930s and the younger generation inspired by the popular movement against the Vietnam War. Healey became a national vice-chair of DSA, and said in 1984, "So that potentially, what DSA represents, if ever realized, can be enormously exciting and important in the country."

Healey moved to Washington, D.C., in 1983 to live with her son, Richard Healey, to help raise her grandchildren. She had been broadcasting on Pacifica Radio in Los Angeles since 1959, and in Washington, she and Richard co-hosted "Dialogue," an hour-long public affairs show on WPFW on Wednesday mornings. 

Dorothy Ray Healey was married to, in her own words, "three good men": Lon Sherman, Don Healey and Phillip Connelly. All three marriages ended in divorce. 

She once wrote: "My hatred of capitalism, which degrades and debases humans, is as intense now as it was when I joined the Young Communist League in 1928. I remain a communist, as I have been all my life, albeit without a party."

Death
Healey died of respiratory failure and pneumonia at age 91 at the Hebrew Home of Greater Washington in Rockville, Maryland.

Legacy
Healey's extensive collection of papers and other material on the CPUSA is archived at the California State University, Long Beach library. Healey is featured in two documentaries, Seeing Red (1983) and Dorothy Healey: An American Red (1984).

References

Further reading
 Dorothy Healey and Maurice Isserman, Dorothy Healey Remembers: A Life in the American Communist Party. New York: Oxford University Press, 1990. Reprinted in paperback as California Red: A Life in the American Communist Party. Urbana: University of Illinois Press, 1993.
 Jon Wiener, "The Communist Party: An Interview with Dorothy Healey," Radical America, vol. 11, no. 3 (May-June 1977), pp. 24-45.

External links
Interview of Dorothy Healey, Center for Oral History Research, UCLA Library Special Collections, University of California, Los Angeles.

1914 births
2006 deaths
People from Denver
American people of Hungarian-Jewish descent
Members of the Communist Party USA
Members of the Democratic Socialists of America
Jewish feminists
People convicted under the Smith Act
American socialist feminists
New American Movement